Helen of Zadar (died 8 October 976), also known as Helen the Glorious, was the queen consort of the Kingdom of Croatia, as the wife of King Michael Krešimir II, from 946 to 969, a period which was marked by "peace, order and expeditious growth". She was the regent of Croatia after the death of her spouse during the minority of her son Stephen Držislav of Croatia, and ruled from 969 until 976.

Life

She is said to have originated from the old patrician family Madi from Zadar. She married Michael Krešimir II, and became queen consort in 946. 

She became the queen dowager of Croatia after the death of her husband in 969. However, since her husband was succeeded by their son who was a minor, she also became the regent of Croatia on behalf of her son. As such, she ruled until her own death.

Regency

Queen Helen built the churches of St Stephen and St. Mary in Solin. The atrium of the St Stephen latter became the Mausoleum of Croatian Kings and is preserved to the present day. Helen was also known by her subjects as "Mother of the Kingdom and protectress of orphans and widows". Jelena played a central role in uniting Croatian and Latin elements within the Kingdom thus laying the groundwork for her son, Stephen Držislav, to assume sovereignty over the Dalmatian thema (which was under nominal Byzantine rule).

Epitaph

Helen died in October 976 and is buried next to her husband in St Mary's. The royal inscription on her sarcophagus was an epitaph discovered by archaeologists. The epitaph, which shed light on the genealogy of early Croatian rulers, was discovered by Don Frane Bulić on 28 August 1898. The epitaph also shows that older rulers, prior to her son Stephen Držislav, bore the title of kings. The English translation of the epitaph is:

In this grave rests Helen the Glorious, wife of King Michael, mother of King Stephen. She ruled/ brought peace to the Kingdom. On the 8th day of October 976 from the incarnation of Our Lord..... she was buried here. During her life as Queen she was also mother of orphans and protectress of widows. May those who look here say: God have mercy upon her soul.

References

External links
http://members.tripod.com/royalcroatia/kresimir2.htm

10th-century Croatian nobility
Croatian Roman Catholics
Year of birth missing
976 deaths
Burials at the Church of St. Mary, Solin
10th-century Croatian people
10th-century Croatian women
10th-century women rulers